Panjabi Hit Squad are British DJs, producers and radio broadcasters for BBC Asian Network and formerly BBC 1Xtra. The group recorded several albums, including Desi Beats Vol 1 with Def Jam. They have won the UK Asian Music Awards three times, in 2003, 2005 and 2012. They produced two albums for Ms Scandalous, Ladies First and Aag.

Career
Panjabi Hit Squad started their broadcasting career on BBC 1Xtra in 2002 where they hosted the Desi Beats show on Monday nights from 12–2am. In 2003, the show moved time slots to Thursday night from 10pm–12am. They won two UK Asian Music Awards (UK AMA) for Best Radio DJ, in 2003 and 2005. In 2007, Panjabi Hit Squad started to host their own show on BBC Asian Network on Saturdays from 6pm–9pm. In 2012 they won the UK AMA for Best Club DJ.

Panjabi Hit Squad host their own 2 hour mix show on the in-flight systems of every emirates flight.

Discography

Albums

See also
Markie Mark

References

External links 
 
 Panjabi Hit Squad (BBC Asian Network)
 

British DJs
BBC Radio 1Xtra presenters
Desi musicians
BBC Asian Network presenters
Def Jam Recordings artists